Paroa is a rural locality situated near Whakatāne in the Bay of Plenty region of New Zealand. The small, predominantly Māori community is located along State Highway 30, and contains a school and a sports rugby club.

The New Zealand Ministry for Culture and Heritage gives a translation of "broad fortified village" for Pāroa.

Marae

Puawairua Marae, located in Paroa, is a traditional meeting ground for the Ngāti Awa hapū of Ngāti Hikakino.

In October 2020, the Government committed $4,871,246 from the Provincial Growth Fund to upgrade Puawairua Marae and 11 other Ngāti Awa marae, creating 23 jobs.

Education

References

Whakatane District
Populated places in the Bay of Plenty Region